Zapad-4 is a suburb of Minsk where factories which employ blind or visually impaired are dominant. These factories were built during Soviet era in which incentives were given to factories which had more than 50% of their employees as persons with disability. The suburb was created in 1980s, Svetopribor is the biggest employer in this suburb. After fall of USSR, the factory's revenues have dropped. Approximately 4000 visually impaired persons live in this suburb.

References

Geography of Minsk
Economy of Minsk
Disability organizations based in Belarus
Blindness organizations